The Mosquito Aviation XE is a single seat homebuilt helicopter.

By 2015 Mosquito Aviation was out of business and the design was being produced by Innovator Technologies of Rockyview, Alberta, Canada. By 2019 the design was being produced by Composite FX of Trenton, Florida.

Design and development
The aircraft was designed to comply with the US Experimental – Amateur-built and European microlight aircraft rules. It features a single main rotor and tail rotor, a single-seat enclosed cockpit with a windshield, skid landing gear and a two-cylinder, air-cooled, two stroke  MZ 202 engine.

The aircraft fuselage is made from composites and metal tubing.

Variants
AIR
(2002) Open aluminum frame with tripod landing gear
XE
(2004)
XEL
XE with floats.
XE285 – Discontinued 
 Inntec 800 2 cylinder 2 cycle 
XE3 – Discontinued 
 CRE MZ 301 3 cylinder 2 cycle 
XE 290
 CFX 800 4-stroke, fuel injected, water cooled
XET
 Solar T62-2A1 turbine

Specifications (XE)

See also
Dynali H2S
Heli-Sport CH-7

References

External links

Homebuilt aircraft
2000s Canadian ultralight aircraft
2000s Canadian helicopters
Mosquito XE
Single-engined piston helicopters